Tony Robinson is a pioneer in the application of recurrent neural networks to speech recognition, being one of the first to discover the practical capabilities of deep neural networks and how they can be used to benefit speech recognition. He first published on the topic while studying for his PhD at Cambridge University in the 1980s. He has published over a hundred, widely cited research papers on automatic speech recognition (ASR) in the years since.

In 1995, Robinson formed SoftSound Ltd, a speech technology company which was acquired by search pioneer Autonomy with a view to using the technology to make unstructured video and voice data easily searchable. Robinson helped build the fastest large vocabulary speech recognition system available at the time, and operating in more languages than any other model, by developing and focusing on recurrent neural networks.

From 2008–2010, Robinson was the Director of the Advanced Speech Group at SpinVox, a provider of speech-to-text conversion services for carrier markets, including wireless, VoIP and cable. Their Automatic Speech Recognition (ASR) system was, for a time, being used more than one million times per day and SpinVox was subsequently acquired by global speech technology company Nuance.

Tony Robinson was also founder of Speechmatics which launched its cloud-based speech recognition services in 2012. Speechmatics subsequently announced a significant technological breakthrough in accelerated new language modeling late in 2017. Robinson continues to publish papers at the rapidly developing edges of speech recognition technology, especially in the area of statistical language modelling.

References

Living people
Year of birth missing (living people)